The European Youths' Team Championship was a European amateur team golf championship for men under 22 organized by the European Golf Association. The inaugural event was held in 1961. It was played every year until 1982, then every second year. It was discontinued in 2006.

Results

Results summary

Source:

Winning teams
2006: Spain: Jordi García del Moral , Jorge Campillo, Nacho Elvira, Marc Perez, Pedro Oriol, Ion Garcia Avis
2004: Scotland: Wallace Booth, Scott Jamieson, Kevin McAlpine, George Murray, Richie Ramsay, Lloyd Saltman
2002: Sweden: Mikael Detterberg, Kalle Edberg, Lars Johansson, Pär Nilsson, Alex Norén, Mats Pilö
2000: England: Jamie Elson, David Griffiths, Richard McEvoy, Phil Rowe, Zane Scotland, Tom Whitehouse
1998: Wales: Neil Mattews, Morgan Palmer, Mark Pilkington, Oliver Pughe, Alex Smith, Craig Williams
1996: Scotland: Roger Beames, Grant Campbell, Alastair Forsyth, Euan Little, David Patrick, Steven Young
1994: Ireland: Eamonn Bradley, Richie Coughlan, Peter Lawrie, Andrew McGormick, Stephen Moloney, Keith Nolan
1992: Sweden: Max Anglert, Fredrik Andersson, Niclas Fasth, Mikael Lundberg, Peter Malmgren, Rikard Strångert
1990: Italien: Emanuele Canonica, Massimo Florioli, Marco Gortana, Michele Reale, Massimo Scarpa, Mario Tadini
1984: Ireland: Jim Carvill, Jason Farrell, John McHenry, John Morris, Paul Murphy, Eoghan O'Connell
1982: Scotland: George Barrie, Colin Dalgleish, Linsey Mann, Colin Montgomerie, Alex Pickles, Ian Young
1981: Spain: Alfonso Vidaor, José Ignacio Márquez, Julian Mayoral, Jesus Lopez, Alejo Ollé, Joaquín Assens
1980: Sweden: Torbjörn Antevik, Freddy Carlsson, Anders Forsbrand, Claes Grönberg, Per Jönsson, Göran Knutsson
1979: Ireland: J. Collins, T. Corridan, Hanna, Brendan McDaid, Ronan Rafferty, Philip Walton
1978: France: Marc Farry, Michel Gayon, J.I. Mouhica, F. Perreau, Tim Planchin, François Illouz
1977: Ireland: Paddy O'Boyle, Sean Flanagan, Brendan McDaid, Peter O'Hagan, D.P. O'Connor, T. Corridan
1976: Sweden: Per Andersson, Jan Andhagen, Hans Ivarsson, Anders Johnsson, Per-Göran Nilsson, Fredrik Stahle
1975: Italy: Alberto Avanzo, Stefano Betti, Stefano Esente, Antonio Lionello, Massimo Manelli, Giuseppe Sita
1974: France: Sven Boinet, Ph. Caillol, Patrick Cotton, Tim Planchin, Philippe Ploujoux, Gary Watine
1973: France: Sven Boinet, G. Bourdy, Patrick Cotton, René Darrieumerlou, Michel Tapia, Philippe Ploujoux
1972: Switzerland: J. Duc, Thomas Fortmann, Yves Hofstetter, Martin Kessler, René Kessler, Peter Müller
1971: France: 
1970: Sweden: Dag Aurell, Olle Dahlgren,  Staffan Mannerström, Christer Nilsson, Jan Rube, Michael Örtegren
1969: Sweden: Olle Dahlgren, Rikard Hansson, Staffan Mannerström, Gunnar Mueller, Christer Nilsson, Michael Örtegren
1968: France: Fr. Blanchard, O. Brizon, J. Desbordes, Hervé Frayssineau, George Leven, Fr. Thevenin-Lemoine
1967: Spain: J. Catarineau, José Luis Noguer, Nicasio Sagardia, Román Tayá, Javier Viladomiu, Santiago Fisas Jr.
1966: Denmark: Kjeld Friche, Per Greve-Jensen, Henry J. Jacobsen, Klaus Hove, Henning Knudsen, Hans Stenderup
1965: France: Hervé Frayssineau
1964: France: O. Brizon, Didier Charmat, Patrick Cros, Hervé Frayssineau, Alexis Godillot, Saubaber, Fr. Thevenin-Lemoine, Watine
1963: Sweden: Claes-Mårten Boive, Hans Hedjerson, Johan Jöhncke, Mats Kristersson, Tony Lidholm, Lars Peil, Christer Peil, Peter Sundgren
1962: Germany: Knut Berlage, von Elten, Hans-Hubert Giesen, Freidrich-Carl Janssen, Peter Jochums, Henning Sostmann, Jürgen Weghmann, N. Wirichs
1961: Germany: Knut Berlage, Hans-Hubert Giesen, Freidrich-Carl Janssen, Peter Jochums, Helge Rademacher, Henning Sostmann, Jürgen Weghmann

See also
European Boys' Team Championship –  amateur team golf championship for men under 18 organized by the European Golf Association.
European Lady Junior's Team Championship –  discontinued amateur team golf championship played 1968–1984 for women under 22 organized by the European Golf Association.

References

External links
European Golf Association: Full results

Amateur golf tournaments
Junior golf tournaments
Team golf tournaments
Recurring sporting events established in 1961
Recurring sporting events disestablished in 2006